Marakou is a Belarusian surname derived from the word marak, "sailor". Notable people with the surname include:
Leanid Marakou
Valery Marakou

See also

Belarusian-language surnames